is a 1971 Japanese kaiju film directed by Yoshimitsu Banno, co-written by Banno and Takeshi Kimura, and produced and distributed by Toho Co., Ltd. It is the 11th film in the Godzilla franchise, and features the fictional monster characters Godzilla and Hedorah. The film stars Akira Yamauchi, Toshie Kimura, and Hiroyuki Kawase, with special effects by Teruyoshi Nakano, and features Haruo Nakajima as Godzilla and Kenpachiro Satsuma as Hedorah. Satsuma would go on to portray Godzilla in later Godzilla films.

Godzilla vs. Hedorah features an environmentalist message, with the malevolent Hedorah being spawned from pollution. The film was released theatrically in Japan on July 24, 1971. It received a theatrical release in the United States under the title Godzilla vs. the Smog Monster in July 1972 by American International Pictures, as a double feature with the American film The Dethmaster.

Plot
The microscopic alien life-form Hedorah feeds on Earth's pollution and grows into a poisonous, acid-secreting sea monster. After he sinks an oil tanker and attacks Dr. Toru Yano and his young son Ken Yano, scarring the doctor, Hedorah's toxic existence is revealed to the public. Ken Yano has visions of Godzilla fighting the world's pollution and insists Godzilla will come to humankind's aid against Hedorah.

Hedorah metamorphoses into an amphibious form, allowing him to move onto land to feed on additional sources of pollution. Hedorah, having emerged at a power station to consume pollutant gases from the smokestacks, is confronted by Godzilla. Hedorah is easily overpowered by Godzilla and retreats into the sea. During the fight, however, several pieces of his new body are flung nearby, which then crawl back into the sea to grow anew and allow the monster to become even more powerful. He returns shortly thereafter in a flying saucer-like shape, then assuming his strongest form of all, his "Perfect Form", which demonstrates some of the strongest powers he has access to yet.

Thousands of people die in Hedorah's raids and even Godzilla is unable to defend against Hedorah's poisonous emissions. As hope sinks, a party is thrown on Mt. Fuji to celebrate one last day of life before Japan - and then, the rest of the world - succumbs to Hedorah. Ken Yano, Yukio Keuchi, Miki Fujinomiya, and the other partygoers realize that Godzilla and Hedorah have come to Mt. Fuji as well for a decisive confrontation. During the battle, Godzilla fights valiantly against Hedorah, but is overpowered by the amorphous alien, losing an eye and having his hand burnt to the bone by Hedorah's acidic body tissues, which corrodes anything it comes into contact with. Finally, Godzilla is almost killed by Hedorah after Hedorah hurls Godzilla into a giant pit, then proceeds to attempt to drown Godzilla in a deluge of chemical sludge.

Dr. Toru Yano and his wife Toshie Yano has determined that drying out Hedorah's body may destroy the otherwise unkillable monster. While Godzilla and Hedorah fought, the JSDF swiftly constructed two gigantic electrodes for this purpose, and attempted to fire them, giving Godzilla the chance to return to the fight.

All of a sudden the electrodes short out, the power cut off by Godzilla and Hedorah's violent battle. Godzilla reactivates and energises the electrodes with his atomic heat ray, dehydrating Hedorah's outer body. Hedorah sheds this outer body and takes flight to escape, but Godzilla propels itself through the air with his atomic heat ray to give chase. Godzilla drags Hedorah back to the electrodes and continues to dehydrate him until Hedorah is on the brink of defeat. Godzilla tears open Hedorah's dried-out body and exposes it to the electrodes again, dehydrating the pieces until nothing remains but dust.

Godzilla returns to the sea, but not before pausing to gaze sternly at the surviving humans. Ken Yano bids goodbye to Godzilla.

Cast

Production

Director Banno initially conceived the idea for Godzilla vs. Hedorah after seeing cities like Yokkaichi covered in black smog and the ocean filled with foam from dumped detergent and formulated the story of an alien tadpole transforming into a monster as a result of the pollution.

The film marked director Banno's directorial debut; however, the budget for Godzilla vs. Hedorah was significantly lower than previous Godzilla films. Banno was only given 35 days to shoot the film and only had one team available to shoot both the drama and monster effects scenes. Veteran Godzilla director Ishirō Honda was later tasked by producer Tomoyuki Tanaka to watch Banno's rough cut and provide advice.

Kenpachiro Satsuma, the actor who played Hedorah, was struck with appendicitis shortly after production as he was giving a publicity interview to a newspaper while only loosely wearing the heavy Hedorah costume. He had to be rushed off to surgery. During the appendectomy, Satsuma learned that painkillers had no effect on him.

Director Yoshimitsu Banno was going to make a sequel to this film, but it was scrapped due to the fact that Tomoyuki Tanaka reportedly hated Godzilla vs. Hedorah, so he fired Yoshimitsu Banno. The next film was going to be called Godzilla vs. Redmoon, but this was scrapped and later became Daigoro vs. Goliath, then they planned a new film called Godzilla vs. The Space Monsters: Earth Defensive Directive, but this was also scrapped and then became The Return of King Ghidorah, which was also scrapped, after which they ultimately made Godzilla vs. Gigan.

The film also includes animated sequences, which were intended to convey the environmental message.

Release

English versions
The film was released in February 1972 by American International Pictures under the title Godzilla vs. the Smog Monster. There were several small alterations: dialogue was dubbed into English by Titan Productions, several shots with Japanese text were replaced with English or textless equivalents, additional sound effects and foley were added to some scenes, and the song "Save the Earth" (based on "Give Back the Sun!", a song in the original Japanese version of the film) was added. This version was rated 'G' by the MPAA, and the same version was given an 'A' certificate by the BBFC for its UK theatrical release in 1975.

The AIP version has been replaced in the North American home video and television markets (including Sony's DVD and Kraken Releasing's DVD and Blu-ray) by Toho's international version, titled Godzilla vs. Hedorah. This version features the original English dub produced in Hong Kong and by extension lacks the English-language song "Save the Earth". This version was first broadcast in the United States by the Sci-Fi Channel on January 20, 1996.

Critical reception

Upon its release in England, Alan Cookman of the Evening Sentinel called the film a "curious—and curiously fascinating—Japanese import [that] is more of a tongue-in-cheek effort than you might imagine", venturing that six-to-twelve-year-olds would likely enjoy it most. He added that, "With wide screen, good colour and effects which include occasional lapses into animation and splitscreen, it is techically quite impressive. Twenty years ago I would have lapped it up."

The U.S. dubbed version of the film was featured in the 1978 book The Fifty Worst Films of All Time, written by Harry Medved with Randy Dreyfuss.

Roger Ebert of the Chicago Sun-Times, in his 1985 review of Godzilla 1985, cited Godzilla vs. Hedorah as his favorite of the Godzilla movies.

In 1998, a reviewer for Stomp Tokyo wrote that the film has "many obvious, crippling flaws" but praised the monster action, and commended the lack of reliance on stock footage and the effort put into the animated segments. In 2004, Stuart Galbraith IV, writing for DVD Talk, stated that the film "earns points for trying something new, to break away from what was fast becoming a tired formula. The film isn't as entertaining as Godzilla vs. Gigan or Godzilla vs. Mechagodzilla, but it is more original and daring, and ... fans will want to pick [it] up."

In their 2018 book Japan's Green Monsters, Sean Rhoads and Brooke McCorkle offer an ecocritical assessment of Godzilla vs. Hedorah. The scholars argue that viewing Godzilla vs. Hedorah through three lenses—those being Japanese environmental history, the monster movie genre, and the historical trends that crippled the Japanese film industry—provides a new understanding of the film and Banno's intentions. Rhoads and McCorkle specifically counter prior poor reviews of the film like those proffered by Medved and Galbraith, and argue that Godzilla vs. Hedorah possesses deeper environmental appeals than the obvious ones present on the film's surface.

Home media
The film was released on VHS by Orion Pictures in 1989 and on DVD by Sony Pictures Home Entertainment on October 19, 2004. The film received another DVD release and a Blu-ray release by Kraken Releasing on May 6, 2014. A video transfer of Godzilla vs. The Smog Monster was released in Canada on DVD packaged with Godzilla vs. Megalon by Digital Disc. In 2019, the Japanese version was included in a Blu-ray box set released by the Criterion Collection, which included all 15 films from the franchise's Shōwa era.

In 2021, Toho premiered a 4K remaster of the film on the Nippon Classic Movie Channel, along with seven other Godzilla films also remastered in 4K. The film was downscaled to 2K for broadcast.

Legacy
After director Yoshimitsu Banno finished directing Godzilla vs. Hedorah, he began work on creating another installment in the Godzilla series. Like his first Godzilla movie, Banno had wanted the next film to have a strong message against pollution. The initial idea was that a mutant starfish-like monster named Deathla battles Godzilla. However, he scrapped this idea and wrote what was going to be Godzilla vs. Hedorah 2. In it, Godzilla was to fight another Hedorah, this time in Africa. Due to Tomoyuki Tanaka's reaction to Banno's first Godzilla film, this was never realized.

Banno spent several years trying to acquire funding for a 40-minute IMAX 3D Godzilla film starring a new version of Hedorah called Deathla. The project was tentatively titled Godzilla 3D: To The Max. The project was eventually scrapped but several members of the production team, including Banno, would work on the 2014 Godzilla. In November 2013, Banno stated that he still hoped to make a sequel to Godzilla vs. Hedorah, but died in 2017. He also served as an executive producer of Godzilla: King of the Monsters (2019) and Godzilla vs. Kong (2021), both of which were released after his death.

Cancelled sequel

Yoshimitsu Banno was so pleased with Godzilla vs. Hedorah that he started writing another Godzilla film. Banno began preparing a script for Godzilla vs. Hedorah 2. However, Tomoyuki Tanaka, who was hospitalized during the production of Godzilla vs. Hedorah, was extremely dissatisfied with the final product and went as far as to tell Banno that he had "ruined Godzilla." Tanaka prevented Banno from directing another Toho film afterwards and demoted him from director to producer on several upcoming films.

According to Banno though, from later interviews conducted with him, Godzilla vs. Hedorah 2 was actually still being worked on after he was removed from the project. Whether the film was going to keep its Africa setting at this stage is not known. The project was eventually scrapped and three more proposed projects would be introduced that following year before finally settling on Godzilla vs. Gigan (1972). In a 2014 interview, Banno stated that he read a Godzilla film history book from the US and that he was surprised to read that the next film would take place in Africa and that Tanaka had said that he had banned him from his director position.

A single remnant of Banno's intentions to produce a sequel exists in the finished film. At the end of the film, an illustration of Hedorah's tadpole form can be seen, followed by a black screen with red text stating "And another one?", implying that Banno was in the process of preparing, or had already prepared a sequel premise for approval.

References

Bibliography

External links

 Godzilla on the web (Japan)
 
 
 
 

1971 films
1970s Japanese-language films
1970s science fiction films
Environmental films
Films produced by Tomoyuki Tanaka
Films set in Shizuoka Prefecture
Films with live action and animation
Giant monster films
Godzilla films
Japanese science fiction films
Japanese sequel films
Kaiju films
1970s monster movies
Toho films
Films about viral outbreaks
1970s Japanese films